Majdi Mosrati (born 13 September 1986) is a retired Tunisian football midfielder.

References

1986 births
Living people
Tunisian footballers
Tunisia international footballers
US Monastir (football) players
Étoile Sportive du Sahel players
Stade Tunisien players
CA Bordj Bou Arréridj players
ES Zarzis players
Association football midfielders
Tunisian Ligue Professionnelle 1 players
Algerian Ligue Professionnelle 1 players
Tunisian expatriate footballers
Expatriate footballers in Algeria
Tunisian expatriate sportspeople in Algeria